Gary Lynn Garrison (born January 21, 1944 in Amarillo, Texas) is an American former professional football player who was a wide receiver in the American Football League (AFL) and the National Football League (NFL).  He attended San Diego State University from 1964 to 1965.  His 26 touchdown receptions are still a career school record.

He began his pro football career with the San Diego Chargers and played 11 seasons (1966–1976) for them in the AFL and NFL, as well as one year (1977) with the Houston Oilers. He was a four-time Pro Bowler, including a year as AFL All-Star with the Chargers in 1968. In 1975, he co-founded the coin-operated video game manufacturer Cinematronics with teammate Dennis Partee.

References

 

American football wide receivers
Players of American football from Texas
1944 births
Living people
American Football League All-Star players
American Conference Pro Bowl players
San Diego State Aztecs football players
San Diego Chargers players
Houston Oilers players
People from Valley Center, California
Sportspeople from Amarillo, Texas
American Football League players